The Plowboy is a Mickey Mouse short animated film first released on June 28, 1929, as part of the Mickey Mouse film series. It was the eighth Mickey Mouse short to be produced, the fifth of that year.

Plot
As the title implies, Mickey is depicted as a farmer alongside Minnie Mouse. He is first seen with his horse while plowing a field. Then Minnie comes along with her cow. She has Mickey milk the cow for her. As he does, the cow starts licking him in an apparent sign of affection. Mickey does not seem pleased and replies by rolling up its muzzle with its own tongue.

Mickey eventually manages to present Minnie with a full bucket of milk and proceeds forcefully to kiss her. Minnie's reply to this sign of affection is knocking his head with the bucket. At some point the horse is stung by a bee, panics and starts galloping. By the time the horse calms down again, the plow has been broken. In the finale, Mickey resorts to using a pig as a plow.

Impact
Curiously, the short is considered mainly notable for the livestock it featured. Minnie's cow is considered to be Clarabelle Cow making her second appearance, and Mickey's plow horse is considered to be Horace Horsecollar making his debut. Both characters became fully anthropomorphic in the 1930 short The Shindig, where they were treated as Mickey and Minnie's friends rather than farm animals. By 1933, Disney Studio publicity referred to The Plowboy as Horace's first film.

This short is also the first time Minnie Mouse is seen wearing her gloves.

Reception
The Film Daily (July 28, 1929): "Splendid. The Disney studio is clicking right along on with its Mickey Mouse cartoon series. The animation is not only clever but packs an idea as well. The adventures of Mickey are not particularly important, but they are funny. A fine subject, replete with fun and laughs."

Variety (November 27, 1929): "Clever as to conception and sound effects, but as heard here faulty and well nigh inaudible. That it got laughs despite this is a testimonial. What was wrong can only be guessed. Before and after shorts played on Western Electric discs came through well. Needless to emphasize that if this was a matter of servicing Cinephone should give it prompt attention, even in a daily change grind. After the success of the first of this sound series at the Colony and Strand on Broadway, the distributors got an unusually big break. There is probably no cartoonist who personally or through assistants consistently has gotten so much originality into his stuff as Walter Disney. At this advanced stage of sound, mediocre reproduction calls for investigations, not alibis."

Home media
The short was released on December 7, 2004 on Walt Disney Treasures: Mickey Mouse in Black and White, Volume Two: 1929-1935.

See also
Mickey Mouse (film series)

References

External links
 
 The Plowboy at Mickey Mouse Follies: Black and White
 

1920s Disney animated short films
1929 short films
1929 comedy films
American black-and-white films
Mickey Mouse short films
1929 animated films
1929 films
Films directed by Walt Disney
Films produced by Walt Disney
Films scored by Carl Stalling
Films set on farms
American comedy short films
Animated films without speech
Columbia Pictures short films
Columbia Pictures animated short films
Films about farmers
1920s English-language films
1920s American films